Deng Wei  Hon FRPS (April 13, 1959 – February 3, 2013) was a Chinese portrait photographer who was a professor at Tsinghua University, China. He was known for his photographic projects such as the Chinese Cultural Celebrity Portrait project, and the World Celebrities project.

Early life
Deng Wei was born into an intellectual family. His grandfather, Deng Xuecen (1877-1949), was a famous traditional Chinese doctor. His father, Deng Yuwen (1917-1989), graduated from Fu Jen Catholic University in Beijing (now located on Taiwan), and was an educator and cultural scholar. During Deng Wei’s youth, he studied painting under the tutelage of Li Keran, a painter and professor at the China Central Academy of Fine Arts. Deng Wei also studied aesthetic theory under the tutelage of Zhu Guangqian, aesthetician and professor of Peking University. From 1978 to 1982, he studied at the Department of Photography in Beijing Film Academy. In 1982, he graduated with excellent grades and started to teach at the Beijing Film Academy.

Career
From 1978 to 1986, Deng Wei finished his first celebrity portrait album entitled "Portrait Collections of Chinese Cultural Celebrity". The collection was published by the Joint Publishing Co. in Hong Kong, which was hailed as "a Cultural Project for China". It filled the gap in Chinese celebrity portrait photography, and made pioneering contributions for the establishment and development of celebrity portraits in China.
From 1982 to 1990, Deng Wei lectured at the Beijing Film Academy, where he taught the courses "Photographic Composition" and "Portrait Photography". During this period he also published "Sculpting in an Instant: The Method of Photographic Sculpting".
In 1984, he shot the film Sacrificed Youth (Qingchun Ji), which won several prestigious awards including the Hong Kong International Film Festival Chinese-language films Awards, 1985; The France Dorset International Film Festival Special Jury Award 1986 and The 6th Hong Kong Film Awards, 1987.
From 1990 to 2000,Deng Wei continued shooting portraits of global celebrities on five continents. He depicted hundreds of portraits in a unique perspective for outstanding politicians, cultural figures, artists and scientists. He also wrote extensively, with his contributions praised as "Outstanding contributions in photographic history".
In 2004, he held a photographic exhibition titled "Portraits of Peace" in the United Nations Headquarters. The exhibition was aimed to promote peace, harmonious coexistence and collaborative development for all mankind.
Since 2008, Deng Wei has been a professor at the Academy of Arts & Design, Tsinghua University. Beijing, China.

Solo exhibitions
2001. World Celebrities Through Deng Wei's Camera[6], National Art Museum of China
2001. Deng Wei: A Look at the World, International Exhibition Center, Beijing, China
2002.Deng Wei: Photography Art Exhibition, Li Keran's exhibition ancient house, Xu Zhou, China
2003.Deng Wei: Photography Art Exhibition, He Xiangning Art Museum, Shenzhen, China
2004. Portraits of Peace, UN Headquarters, New York
2005. Portraits of Peace: Impressions of World Peacemakers and Visionaries, Atlanta.
2006, Wind from China, The Royal Photographic Society in England
2007, Deng Wei Photography Exhibition “In Pursuit of Sunlight”, National Art Museum of China
2008, Sun on the Aegean Sea, Capital Museum in China
2009, Bijinger, Capital Museum in China
2010, Chinese, 2010 Shanghai Expo in China
Photography works are collected worldwide by a number of organizations such as The National Gallery, museums and libraries.

Books
A Photographic Record of Eminent Cultural Figures of China, Joint Publishing Co. (HK), 1986, INSB 962·04·0504·8
The Method of Photographic Sculpting, The Chinese Institute of Photography, 1986
Sculpting in an Instant, Zhejiang Photographic Press, 1991, 1992, 1998, INSB: 7-80536-120-7/J·60
Deng Wei's Diary, Jiang Xi Fine Arts Publishing House, 1999, /J·573
A Photographic Record of Eminent World Figures, Jiang Xi Fine Arts Publishing House, 2000, /J·572
Deng Wei: A Look at the World, Zhejiang Photographic Press, 2001, 
Top-Notch Photographic Works By 6DengWei, Chongqing Publishing House, 2003, 
Selection of Photographic Works By DengWei, Chongqing Publishing House, 2003, . J·1001
Eight years Vol.1, China Travel & Tourism Press, 2004, INSB 7-5032-2271-9/J·75
Eight years Vol.2, China Travel & Tourism Press, 2004, INSB 7-5032-2272-7/J·76
Eight years Vol.3, China Travel & Tourism Press, 2004, INSB 7-5032-2273-5/J·77
Deng Wei and Fifty Faces, China Intercontinental Press, 2004, 
Wind from China, The Royal Photographic Society, 2006
Collected Literary Works by Deng Wei, China Photographic Publishing House, 2007, 
Album of  Works Donated by Deng Wei To The National Art Museum of China, People’s Education Press, 2007, 
The Story of Learning Chinese Painting, Shandong Pictorial Publishing House, 
Greece Through the eyes of Prof. Deng Wei, China Federation of Literary and Art Circles Publishing House, 2008, 
In Pursuit of Sunlight, Tianjin Yang Liu Qing Fine Arts Press, 2009, 
Beijinger, Beijing Publishing House (Group), 2009, /K.802
Chinese, China Intercontinental Press, 2010,

Main Awards
Film Sacrificed Youth (Qingchun ji) 1984, The Hong Kong International Film Festival Chinese-language films Awards, 1985. The France Dorset International Film Festival Special Jury Award 1986. The 6th Hong Kong Film Awards, 1987.
The Golden Medal of The 6th China Photography Arts, 2004
2010, Award for outstanding graduates of the 60th anniversary of the Beijing Film Academy, 2006
Honorary Fellowship (Hon.FRPS) of The Royal Photographic Society, 2007
The Greece Wisdom Award, 2009
PPA International Award for Outstanding Contribution, 2010
Outstanding Graduates Award of The 60th anniversary of Beijing Film Academy.
Honorary Doctoral Degree of University of Athens, 2011

Major Portrait Photography Works
Sir Edward Heath, Elizabeth Frank, Doris Lessing, Zbigniew Kazimierz, John Fowles, Dame Merle Florence Park, George W. Bush, Gerald Ford, Henry Kissinger, Milton Friedman, Pervez Musharraf, Yitzhak Rabin, Willard Van Orman Quine, Liv Ragnheim Arnesen, Desmond Tutu, Sir James Whyte Black, Ronald Reagan, Christo Claude, Walter Scheel, Mary Robinson, Cyril Northcote Parkinson, Leon N Cooper, Robert Charles Venturi, Pan Shou, Sir Tom Stoppard, Antony Hewish, Yousuf Karsh, Lee Kuan Yew, Edmund Hillary, Sir William Gerald Golding, Baruch Samuel Blumberg, Mainza Mathias Chona, Vigdís Finnbogadóttir, Ilya Viscount Prigogine, Sir John Robert Vane, David Russell Lange, Georges Charpak, Alain Bienaymé, Frederick Sanger, Wendy Taylor, Gillian Ayres, Jean-Louis Curtis, John Fowles, Sir Peter Maxwell Davies, Sir Alan Acykbourn, George Pratt Shultz, Shiing-shen Chern, Pierre Werner, Mary Quant, James Callaghan, Arpad Goncz, Václav Havel, Stephen Jay Gould, Jean-Luc Dehaene, Jean-Claude Juncker, Robert James Lee Hawke, Helmut Schmidt Chiluba, Jimmy Carter, Chaim Herzog, John Malcolm Fraser, Alekos Fassianos, Natalia Mela, Mariza Koch, Eirini Papa, Marc Riboud, Paul Andreu, Daniel Buren, Irina Bokova, Luc Montagnier, Jean Reno, Dominique de Villepin, Pierre Henri, John Berger, Christopher Francis Patten.

Chinese：
Liang Shuming, Ye Shengtao, Feng Naichao, Bing Xin, Wang Zhaowen, Zong Baihua, Ji Xian|in, Cai Yi, Shen Congwen, Yu Pingbo, Yu Zhenfei, Ch'ien Chung-shu, Yang Jiang, Fei Xiaotong, Ai Qing, Ding Ling, Guo Shaoyu, Fung Yu-lan, Ba Jin, Ye Qianyu, Cheng Fangwu, Zhu Guangqian, Cao Yu, Wang Li, Jiang Zhaohe, Wang Geyi, Xiao Qian, Yao Xueyin, Yu Ling, Liu Kaiqu, Guan Shanyue, Wu Yinxian, Wu Guanzhong, Wu Zuoren, Li Keran, Liao Bingxiong, Xiao Jun, Nie Gannu, Yan Wenliang, Mao Dun, Zhao Puchu, Guan Liang, Li Xiongcai, Cheng Shifa, Shi Lu, Zhang Ding, Zhu Jizhan, Lu Shuxiang, Xiao Yan, Zhou Yang, Qian Songyan, Li Kuchan, Huang Zhou, Aisin-Gioro Pujie, Qi Gong, Fei Xinweo, Lu Yanshao, Sha Menghai, Qin Mu, Rong Geng, Cheng Fangwu, Yang Xianyi, Zhou Ruchang, Chen Daisun, Jin Yuelin, Hou Wailu, Hou Renzhi, Deng Guangming, Bian Zhilin, Leoh-Ming Pei, Chen-Ning Yang, Tsung-Dao Lee, Yuan Tseh Lee, Wu Liangyong, Ouyang Zhongshi, A Lai, Zao Wou Ki, Zhong Nanshan, Pu Cunxin, Yuan Longping, Jackie Chen, Zhang Chaoyang, Yang Liwei, Yao Ming, etc.

References

External links
Biographical Documentary -Deng Wei by CCTV, 2002 . 人生在线：邓伟
 《邓伟为一百位世界名人拍照》上
 《邓伟为一百位世界名人拍照》下
Interview with Deng Wei at CCTV, 2007, [东方之子]邓伟:环球拍摄名人的摄影家, 中央电视台访谈
Interview with Deng Wei at Phoenix TV, 2007, [鲁豫有约]邓伟:照片背后的故事，凤凰卫视访谈
Interview with Deng Wei at CCTV, 2008, [面对面]邓伟:当名人遇到我，中央电视台访谈 
Documentary -Deng Wei《东方全纪录》纪录片, 邓伟《我为世界名人拍照》2004
邓伟：跑一场看不到终点的“马拉松”, 人民日报，2004年9月16日
邓伟：用镜头触动世界名人心灵, cctv.com, 2006年

摄影家邓伟：我把宝贵的青春交付给等待，2007年7月
英中网：访著名华人摄影家邓伟先生，2008年02月15日
邓伟：“教书和摄影组成我的生命” 中国教育报，2011年07月
邓伟·法国名人肖像，中国艺术报，2011年11月
湖南卫视 《背后的故事》－《邓伟眼中的名人世界》采访

Chinese photographers
1959 births
2013 deaths
Artists from Beijing